Carpentier is a Norman-Picard surname, variant form of French Charpentier and is similar to the English Carpenter, that is borrowed from Norman. In Basse Normandie, the most common form is Lecarpentier.

The words carpentier, charpentier, carpenter are ultimately from Late Latin;  "artifex" or "wainwright", equivalent to Latin  "two wheeled carriage" ( < Celtic (Gaulish) *; cf. OIr  "chariot") + suffix -arius - ARY; see ER2.

Carpentier may refer to:

Notable people
 Alain Carpentier (born 1933), French heart surgeon
 Alejo Carpentier (1904–1980), Cuban writer and musicologist
 Alexandra Carpentier (born 1987), French mathematical statistician
 Charles Francis Carpentier (1896-1964), American politician
 Donald Dee Carpentier (1931-1982), American politician
 Édouard Carpentier (1926-2010), French professional wrestler
 Évariste Carpentier (1845-1922), Belgian painter
 Georges Carpentier (1894–1975), French boxer
 Horace Carpentier (1824–1918), American lawyer and first mayor of Oakland, California
 Jean-Baptiste Le Carpentier (1719-1829) French political activist from Normandy
 Jules Carpentier (1851–1921) French engineer and inventor
 Marcel Carpentier (1895–1977) French military officer
 Marguerite Jeanne Carpentier (1886–1965) French painter and sculptor
 Maritie and Gilbert Carpentier (Maritie 1922–2002, Gilbert 1920–2000), married French TV producers
 Antoine Matthieu Le Carpentier (1709-1773), French architect 
 Patrick Carpentier (born 1971), Canadian race car driver
 Paul Claude-Michel Carpentier (1787-1877), French portrait, genre, history painter and author
 Pieter de Carpentier (c. 1586–1659), Dutch or Flemish administrator of the Dutch East India Company
 Prudent Carpentier (born 1922), Canadian politician

Fictional characters
 Allen Carpentier, protagonist in Niven & Pournelle's Inferno (novel)

See also

References

French-language surnames
Occitan-language surnames
Occupational surnames